The Mississippi State League was a professional, Class D level minor baseball league that played in the  1921 season. The league consisted of teams based exclusively in Mississippi.

History
The Mississippi State League  began play in 1921. It featured four teams: the Clarksdale Cubs of Clarksdale, Mississippi, the Greenwood Indians of Greenwood, Mississippi, the Jackson Red Sox of Jackson, Mississippi and the Meridian Mets of Meridian, Mississippi. 

The Cubs finished in first place in the league's regular season. Greenwood beat them in the postseason, five games to none to claim the championship. Meridian finished in third place, while Jackson finished in last.

Multiple future and former major leaguers played in the league, including Hughie Critz, Happy Foreman, Red Lucas, Red McDermott, Rebel Oakes (who also managed Jackson) and Earl Webb. 

The league folded after 1921. All four cities had teams in the Cotton States League the following year.

Cities Represented 
 Clarksdale, MS: Clarksdale Cubs 1921 
 Greenwood, MS: Greenwood Indians 1921 
 Jackson, MS: Jackson Red Sox 1921 
 Meridian, MS: Meridian Mets 1921

Standings & statistics

1921 Mississippi State League
schedule
Playoff: Greenwood 5 games, Clarksdale 0.

References

Defunct minor baseball leagues in the United States
Baseball leagues in Mississippi
Sports leagues established in 1921
Sports leagues disestablished in 1921